Radhabinod Koijam (born 19 July 1948) is a politician from Manipur. He briefly served as the 10th Chief Minister of Manipur in 2001.

Political career 

In 1995, Koijam was elected to Manipur Legislative Assembly as Indian National Congress candidate. Later, he joined the Samata Party (now led by Uday Mandal).

Koijam was sworn in as Chief Minister of Manipur on 15 February 2001. The government was however, short-lived. The coalition he was leading fell in May the same year.

He was the president of the Nationalist Congress Party in Manipur. In 2007 he was elected to the Legislative Assembly of Manipur as a Nationalist Congress Party candidate from Thangmeiband Assembly Constituency.

In September 2015, Koijam changed his loyalties to Bharatiya Janata Party along with Okram Joy Singh and Yumnam Joykumar Singh looking forward for 2017 Manipur Legislative Assembly election. He is a current member of the Bharatiya Janata Party.

Assembly election results

References 

Nationalist Congress Party politicians from Manipur
Bharatiya Janata Party politicians from Manipur
Indian National Congress politicians
Chief Ministers of Manipur
Living people
Samata Party politicians
Manipur politicians
1948 births
Manipur MLAs 1980–1984
Manipur MLAs 1985–1990
Manipur MLAs 1995–2000
Manipur MLAs 2000–2002
Manipur MLAs 2007–2012